Fenzi may refer to:

 Fenzi, entry about the Fenzi Bank and family
 Emanuele Fenzi (1784–1875), Italian banker, iron producer, and concessionaire of the Livorno–Florence railway
 Emanuele Orazio Fenzi (1843–1924), birth name of Italian-born horticulturist, known in the United States as Francesco Franceschi

Other uses of Fenzi 
 Palazzo Fenzi, palace in Florence, Italy
 Franceschi Park, park in Santa Barbara, California, bearing the American namesake of Emanuele Orazio Fenzi

Italian-language surnames